Deon Morie Humphrey (born May 7, 1976) is a former American football linebacker who played from 1999 to 2003 in the National Football League. He played college football at Florida State University.

Originally an All-American safety coming out of Lake Worth (Florida), Humphrey was later converted into an outside linebacker.

References

External links 
 https://web.archive.org/web/20141205025524/http://www.kffl.com/player/1633/nfl/news/deon-humphrey

1976 births
Living people
American football linebackers
Florida State Seminoles football players
Carolina Panthers players
San Diego Chargers players
Jacksonville Jaguars players
People from Clewiston, Florida